Dimestore Hoods was a rock band composed of Jim Korthe (lead singer and drums), Todd Deguchi (guitar), Tom McNerney (guitar) and Dave Wadsworth (bass). They produced one album for MCA Records in 1996.

Korthe and Deguchi later went on to form the nu metal band 3rd Strike.

Discography

Album 
 Dimestore Hoods (1996) MCAD-11387
 Blood In My Eyes
 Old Man Inside
 Life In The Asylum
 Freakshow
 Windows Of Disease
 Taste Of Suicide
 Minds Of Confusion
 War Machine
 18 With A Bullet
 Smile Now (Cry Another Day)
 Better Times

Metalcore musical groups
Rap metal musical groups